Cristuru Secuiesc is a town in Harghita County, Romania. It lies in the Székely Land, an ethno-cultural region in eastern Transylvania. The town administers two villages:
Betești (Betfalva), part of Mugeni until 2004, and Filiaș (Fiatfalva).

Location
Cristuru Secuiesc lies on the Transylvanian Plateau, in the area where the river Goagiu flows into the Târnava Mare. It is located in the southwestern part of the county, on the border with Mureș County.

History
The town was part of the Székely Land area of the historical Transylvania province. It belonged to Udvarhelyszék until the administrative reform of Transylvania in 1876, when it fell within the Udvarhely County of the Kingdom of Hungary. In the aftermath of World War I and the Hungarian–Romanian War of 1918–1919, it passed under Romanian administration; after the Treaty of Trianon of 1920, like the rest of Transylvania, it became part of the Kingdom of Romania. During the interwar period, the town fell within Odorhei County. From 1933 to 1940, the town was renamed after I. G. Duca, the Prime Minister of Romania who was assassinated in December 1933 for his efforts to suppress the fascist Iron Guard movement.

In 1940, the Second Vienna Award granted Northern Transylvania to Hungary and the town was held by Hungary until 1944. After Soviet occupation, the Romanian administration returned and the town became officially part of Romania in March 1945. Between 1952 and 1960, Cristuru Secuiesc fell within the Magyar Autonomous Region, between 1960 and 1968 the Mureș-Magyar Autonomous Region. In 1968, the region was abolished, and since then, the town has been part of Harghita County.

Demographics 

As of the Romanian census of 2002, the town has a population of 9,672 of whom 9,201 (95.13%) are ethnic Hungarians, 2.47 ethnic Roma, 2.27% ethnic Romanians and 0.12% others.

Demographic movements according to census data:

In terms of religion, 46.02% of its inhabitants are Reformed, 35.99% are Unitarian, 14.27% are Roman Catholic, 2.33% are Romanian Orthodox.

Natives
 Alexandru Gergely

Sights
The Unitarian Gimnazium (secondary school) was established in the 18th century. The Catholic church has medieval murals.

International relations

Twin towns – Sister cities
Cristuru Secuiesc is twinned with:
 Ajka, Hungary (1992)
 Csurgó, Hungary
 Derecske, Hungary
 Dévaványa, Hungary (1994)
 Dunakeszi, Hungary
 Kalocsa, Hungary
 Karcag, Hungary (1990)
 Kúnszentmiklós, Hungary
 Lánycsók, Hungary
 Moldava nad Bodvou, Slovakia
 Pesterzsébet – 20th district of Budapest, Hungary
 Senta, Serbia

Gallery

References

External links 

 Town Website 
 Molnár István Museaum 

Towns in Romania
Populated places in Harghita County
Localities in Transylvania
Székely communities